Heads Up! is an educational television show which is produced and broadcast by TVOntario. The host is Bob McDonald, who is better known as the host of the weekly radio show Quirks & Quarks.

Heads Up! premiered on TVO on September 8, 2005.

List of episodes

There are three seasons, each with 13 episodes, for a total of 39 episodes. Here's a list of the first season along with the original broadcast dates:

Season 1
 "How Do I Become an Astronaut?" (September 8, 2005)
 "Why is the Sun so Hot?" (September 15, 2005)
 "Where's Our Place in Space?" (September 22, 2005)
 "How Do We Get Around in Space?" (September 29, 2005)
 "What are Shooting Stars?" (October 6, 2005)
 "How Cold is Pluto?" (October 13, 2005)
 "Why Do Some Planets Have Rings?" (October 20, 2005)
 "Why Do Stars Twinkle?" (October 27, 2005)
 "Is Earth the Only Planet With Water?" (November 3, 2005)
 "When Can I Go To Mars?" (November 10, 2005)
 "Is Anyone Out There?" (November 17, 2005)
 "Why Do Comets Have Tails?" (November 24, 2005)
 "Why are Planets Round?" (December 1, 2005)

Season 2
 "How Far Can We Go in Space?" (September 7, 2006)
 "When Can We Take Holidays in Space?" (September 14, 2006)
 "How Big Is the Earth?" (September 21, 2006)
 "Do UFOs Really Exist?" (September 28, 2006)
 "When Are We Going Back To The Moon?" (October 5, 2006)
 "What Happens When You Fall Into a Black Hole?" (October 12, 2006)
 "How Does the Earth Move?" (October 19, 2006)
 "Is There Life On Other Worlds?" (October 26, 2006)
 "How Do you Drive A Space Robot?" (November 2, 2006)
 "Where Do Stars Come From?" (November 9, 2006)
 "How Can I Explore Space Now?" (November 16, 2006)
 "Do Other Planets Have Weather?" (November 23, 2006)
 "Where Is the Center of the Universe?" (November 30, 2006)

Season 3
 "Do Killer Whales Really Kill?" (January 7, 2008)
 "What Makes a Volcano Erupt?" (January 14, 2008)
 "Why Do Tornadoes Do So Much Damage?" (January 21, 2008)
 "How Fast Can We Go on the Ground?" (January 28, 2008)
 "How Fast Can We Go in the Air?" (February 4, 2008)
 "What's Happening to the Glaciers?" (February 11, 2008)
 "What Will Cars Look Like in the Future?" (February 18, 2008)
 "What Causes Earthquakes?" (February 25, 2008)
 "What's the Weather Like in Space?" (March 3, 2008)
 "Do Killer Whales Really Kill?" (March 10, 2008)
 "What's at the Bottom of the Ocean?" (March 17, 2008)
 "What Is the Universe Made Of?" (March 24, 2008)

External links
 Yes I Can! Science 

2000s Canadian children's television series
2000s Canadian documentary television series
Canadian children's education television series
Science education television series
TVO original programming